Leif Nielsen (born 31 March 1943) is a Danish former football (soccer) player, who played for Fremad Amager and BK Frem in Denmark. Nielsen was the top goalscorer of the 1967 Danish football championship. He played four games and scored four goals for the Denmark national under-21 football team.

External links
Danish national team profile
Peders fodboldstatistik profile

1943 births
Living people
Danish men's footballers
Boldklubben Frem players
Association football forwards
Footballers from Copenhagen